The following is a list of the Bolivia national football team's competitive records and statistics.

Player records

Players in bold are still active, at least at club level.

Most caps

Most goals

Competition records

FIFA World Cup

Copa América

FIFA Confederations Cup

Pan American Games

Head-to-head record
The list shown below shows the national football team of Bolivia's all-time international record against opposing nations. The stats are composed of FIFA World Cup and Copa América, matches as well as numerous international friendly tournaments and matches.

The following tables show Bolivia's all-time international record, correct as of 1 February 2022 vs. Chile.

AFC

CAF

CONCACAF

CONMEBOL

UEFA

Full Confederation record

References

Bolivia national football team records and statistics
National association football team records and statistics